
Gmina Siennica Różana is a rural gmina (administrative district) in Krasnystaw County, Lublin Voivodeship, in eastern Poland.

Villages
Gmina Siennica Różana contains the villages and settlements of Baraki, Boruń, Kozieniec, Maciejów, Rudka, Siennica Królewska Duża, Siennica Królewska Mała, Siennica Różana, Stójło, Wierzchowiny, Wola Siennicka, Zagroda, Żdżanne and Zwierzyniec.

Neighbouring gminas
Gmina Siennica Różana is bordered by the town of Krasnystaw and by the gminas of Chełm, Kraśniczyn, Krasnystaw, Leśniowice and Rejowiec.

References
Polish official population figures 2006

Siennica Rozana
Krasnystaw County